London Buses route 183 is a Transport for London contracted bus route in London, England. Running between Pinner (NW London) and Golders Green station (N London), it is operated by London Sovereign.

History
Route 183 commenced operating on 3 October 1934, running from Northwood Garage to Golders Green station via Pinner, North Harrow, Kenton, Kingsbury and Hendon, operating from Hendon garage, using Leyland Titan STDs which were in turn replaced in 1953 by the AEC Regent III RTs. This route was still much the same in 1952. LT-type buses allocated to Harrow Weald garage were used on route 183 between Golders Green and Pinner. In April 1937, STD-type buses first went into service on route 183.

Upon being re-tendered, the route passed to London Sovereign with a new contract commencing in September 1999, with single deck Plaxton Pointer bodied Dennis Dart SLFs.

In 2008, the route was the subject to persistent theft.  Gangs of pickpockets targeted old people, slashing their bags and stealing their money, keys and other possessions.

In 2009 the route was again re-tendered and was retained by London Sovereign with a new contract awarded. On 18 January 2014, the frequency was increased again, by 25 per cent.

On 7 October 2016, the route commenced operating 24 hours on Friday and Saturday nights to coincide with the introduction of the Night Tube on the Jubilee line.

Gallery

References

External links

Bus routes in London
Transport in the London Borough of Barnet
Transport in the London Borough of Brent
Transport in the London Borough of Harrow